The Queensland PGA Championship is a golf tournament on the PGA Tour of Australasia. The tournament is currently held at Nudgee Golf Club in Nudgee.

History
The event was founded as the Queensland Professional Championship in 1926. The inaugural championship was played at Brisbane Golf Club in late November with 12 professionals competing. There was a 36-hole stroke-play stage with the leading 4 qualifying for the match-play. The 36-hole semi-finals were played the following day with the 36-hole final on the third day. Arthur Spence, the Royal Queensland professional, beat Jack Quarton, the Toowoomba professional, in the final. In 1927 the number of qualifiers was increased to 8, with the quarter and semi-finals played over 18 holes on the second day. From 1930 the event was extended to four days, with all matches over 36 holes.

Charlie Brown was the most successful golfer before World War II, winning three times in succession from 1930 to 1932. He appeared in 7 finals in a row and 9 finals in all. Ossie Walker was another three-time winner, in 1934, 1936 and 1938. After the war, Reg Want dominated, winning 7 times in 9 years to 1954. He didn't play in one of the other two, losing the other at the quarter-final stage. He won for an eighth time in 1962. Darrell Welch won four times in five years between 1956 and 1960. Since Want's eighth win in 1962, no player has won the event more than twice.

The championship has been a PGA Tour of Australasia event since 2009 and has been held at City Golf Club in Toowoomba during that period.

No tournament was played in 2021, but the tournament returned in 2022 with a change of venue to Nudgee Golf Club in Nudgee.

Notable former winners of the event include major champions David Graham, Greg Norman and Ian Baker-Finch. In addition, 2015 PGA champion Jason Day narrowly lost out in a playoff in the 2005 event when it was part of the Von Nida Tour.

Winners

Multiple winners
Sixteen players have won this tournament more than once through 2020.

8 wins
Reg Want: 1946, 1947, 1948, 1949, 1951, 1952, 1954, 1962
4 wins
Darrell Welch: 1956, 1958, 1959, 1960
3 wins
Charlie Brown: 1930, 1931, 1932
Ossie Walker: 1934, 1936, 1938
2 wins
Arthur Gazzard: 1933, 1935
Eddie Anderson: 1937, 1939
Jack Brown: 1953, 1963
John Collins: 1957, 1964
Bobby Gibson: 1965, 1969
John Klatt: 1970, 1974
Errol Hartvigsen: 1971, 1975
Randall Vines: 1973, 1976
Terry Price: 1988, 1990
Ossie Moore: 1986, 1992
Lucas Parsons: 1997, 1998
Peter Senior: 1987, 2010

Notes

References

External links
Coverage on PGA Tour of Australasia's official site

PGA Tour of Australasia events
Golf tournaments in Australia
Golf in Queensland
Sports competitions in Queensland
Recurring sporting events established in 1926
1926 establishments in Australia